Caroline Donald is a British journalist and author, and was the gardening editor of The Sunday Times from 2000 to 2019.

Her book, The Generous Gardener: Private Paradises Shared is a compilation of 43 article or essays, primarily from The Sunday Times. Gardeners and their gardens covered include Jilly Cooper, Will Alsop, Henry Cecil, Corinne Bailey Rae, Jim Carter, Imelda Staunton, Christopher Gibbs, Natasha Spender, Penelope Hobhouse, Bob Flowerdew, Kelly Brook, and Roy Lancaster. It has been described as a "a pick up and browse gem to lift the spirits and reinforce what we all know – that gardening is good for you!"

Publications
The Generous Gardener: Private Paradises Shared, Pimpernel Press,

References

Living people
British women journalists
The Sunday Times people
Year of birth missing (living people)